Alekseyevka is a village and municipality in the Quba Rayon of Azerbaijan.  In the mid-twentieth century, the neighbouring village of Kozlyakovka was merged into Alekseyevka and now forms its southern end.

References

External links 

Populated places in Quba District (Azerbaijan)